William Farrington may refer to:
William Farrington (soldier), English soldier and diplomat
Sir William Hicks Farrington, 5th Baronet (1838–1901), of the Farrington baronets
William Farrington (Royalist), English politician

See also
Farrington (name)